Predator: Original Motion Picture Score is the official soundtrack album of the 1987 action film Predator. It was composed by Alan Silvestri. The score is completely orchestral and was released in 2003.

In 2003, Varèse Sarabande and Fox Music released the soundtrack album as part of its limited release CD Club collection; the album also includes the Elliot Goldenthal arrangement of the 20th Century Fox fanfare used on Alien 3, where the penultimate note of the fanfare freezes and rises in crescendo before abruptly cutting off.

In 2007, Silvestri's themes had been reused in the score of Aliens vs. Predator: Requiem, composed by Brian Tyler.

In 2010, the same year Predators featured an adaptation of Silvestri's score by John Debney,  Intrada Records released the album in a 3000-copy limited edition with remastered sound, many cues combined and renamed, and most notably (as with Intrada's release of Basil Poledouris's score for RoboCop) presenting the original end credits music as recorded (the film versions are differently mixed). This release is notable for having sold out within a day.

In 2018, Silvestri's themes had been reused in the score of The Predator, composed by Henry Jackman.

Track listing

Original

Intrada edition

References

1980s film soundtrack albums
1987 soundtrack albums
Varèse Sarabande soundtracks
Science fiction soundtracks
Alan Silvestri soundtracks
Predator (franchise)